Jovon Willesley Makama (born 1 February 2004) is an English professional footballer who plays as a forward for Lincoln City.

Club career

Lincoln City
Makama signed his first professional contract with Lincoln on 17 May 2021. On 11 August 2021, he joined Gainsborough Trinity on loan with Lincoln City teammate Hayden Cann for the season. Following his season at Gainsborough he would commit his long-term future at Lincoln. He would make his Lincoln City debut against Doncaster Rovers in the EFL Cup on 9 August 2022. On 12 August, Makama joined Brackley Town on loan for the season. He would score his first Lincoln goal during his Brackley loan spell, playing against Barnsley in the EFL Trophy on 30 August 2022. He was recalled from his loan on 4 January 2023.

Career statistics

References 

Living people
Lincoln City F.C. players
Gainsborough Trinity F.C. players
Brackley Town F.C. players
Association football forwards
2004 births
English footballers